Girl is a 1994 novel written by Blake Nelson. The book chronicles teen girl Andrea Marr's exploration of the Northwest music scene at the height of the "grunge" revolution.

Girl was made into a film of the same name starring Dominique Swain, Portia de Rossi, and Selma Blair in 1998.

Portions of the novel first appeared in Sassy Magazine.

Two more installments of the GIRL Series are available on Amazon Kindle.

Plot summary

Andrea Marr begins high school as an ordinary suburban teen.  When approaching graduation in her senior year, she decides to explore downtown and comes across mysterious and charismatic musician Todd Sparrow. Todd is the lead singer of a local band called The Color Green. This begins Andrea’s journey through the Pacific Northwest indie-rock music scene of the 1990s. In the process she breaks out of her suburban sheltered upbringing and finds herself, her sexuality, and experiences first lust in the year before she goes off to attend Brown University.

Publisher

This book was originally published by Touchstone/Simon & Schuster in September 1994.  It was re-issued by Simon Pulse as a young adult title in 2007.

A sequel to Girl, Dream School, was published by Figment.

The third installment of the Girl series, The City Wants You Alone, is available exclusively on Amazon Kindle.

Girl is widely considered a contemporary classic and has recently been reissued for a third time by Simon Pulse (2017).  The novel has been in print continuously for twenty-four years.  Vanity Fair called GIRL:  "A seminal coming of age text".  It is also considered the best literary rendering of the 1990s subcultures Riot Grrrl and Grunge Rock.

External links
Official website of Blake Nelson

1994 American novels
American young adult novels
Novels about music
Novels by Blake Nelson
American novels adapted into films
Touchstone Books books